Brownsboro can refer to:

Brownsboro, Alabama
Brownsboro, Kentucky
Brownsboro, Oregon
Brownsboro, Texas, city in Henderson County, Texas
Brownsboro, Caldwell County, Texas, unincorporated community
Brownsboro Farm, Kentucky
Brownsboro Village, Kentucky